Paul Otto Kardow (September 19, 1915 – April 27, 1968), nicknamed "Tex", was a Major League Baseball pitcher who played for one season. He pitched in two games for the Cleveland Indians during the 1936 Cleveland Indians season.

External links

1915 births
1968 deaths
People from Humble, Texas
Cleveland Indians players
Major League Baseball pitchers
Baseball players from Texas
Minor league baseball managers
Fargo-Moorhead Twins players
New Orleans Pelicans (baseball) players
Knoxville Smokies players
Jersey City Giants players
Evergreen Greenies players
Augusta Tigers players
Montgomery Rebels players
Wilkes-Barre Barons (baseball) players
Greenville Lions (minor league) players
Dallas Rebels players
Greenville Spinners players
Wilmington Blue Rocks (1940–1952) players
Lancaster Red Roses players
Longview Texans players
Sportspeople from Harris County, Texas